Ha Shing Chi (born 30 May 1982 in Hong Kong) is a Hong Kong footballer who plays for Hong Kong First Division League club Southern as a left-back.

Club career

South China
Ha Shing Chi joined South China youth team in 1997 and was promoted to the first team in 2003.

Although he was promoted to the first team, he did not have too many match-play chances until the 2004–05 season as South China refused to use any foreign players. On the other hand, when Ha was studying in the City University of Hong Kong, he represented its football team, helping the team to claim the champions of Hong Kong University Football League in 2005 by defeating Chinese University of Hong Kong in the final. He was also crowned the Most Valuable Player of the match.

However, he only featured one FA Cup match during the 2005–06 season, As the club promised to strengthen the squad in the following season after their request to remain in the First Division was approved, Ha was released by the club.

Playing in the Second Division
After being released by South China in 2006, he joined Second Division club Lucky Mile as a semi-professional player. He joined another Second Division club Kwok Keung in the next season.

Tuen Mun Progoal
Ha returned to the top-tier division campaign as he joined First Division club Tuen Mun Progoal in the 2008–09 season. He was one of the key members and featured in most of the matches. His great performance attracted Happy Valley, which later Ha joined after the season.

Happy Valley
Ha joined fellow First Division club Happy Valley in the 2009–10 season. However, he only featured three league matches throughout the season. Happy Valley were also relegated after the season. He left the club eventually.

Southern
Ha returned to the second-tier division and joined newly promoted side Southern. In the first season, he helped the team to win the champions of Junior Shield by scoring the winning 2–1 goal in the 63rd minute. He opted to stay at the club after the season.

As the club's left back first choice, he helped the club gain promotion to the First Division for the first in club history as Southern placed second in the league table. This also meant Ha's second return to the First Division.

In the 2012–13 season, he did not feature the first five Southern matches. As the club wished to improve their defence, Ha started in Southern's sixth match against South China, and the match eventually ended with a goalless draw. Give rise to Ha's impressive performance, he became the usual left back starter in the following matches, not just having done defensive work, but also often provided freekick assists. He has been selected to the Team of the Week twice in the season.

Personal life
Ha Shing Chi, along with his elder brother, are charged by the Independent Commission Against Corruption (Hong Kong) for alleged accepting and offering over HK$328,000 in illegal commissions respectively in relation to the trading in securities.

Career statistics

Club
 As of 5 May 2013. The following table does not include stats in the 2003–04 and 2004–05 seasons.

Remarks:
1 Others include 2013 Hong Kong AFC Cup play-offs.
2 Hong Kong League Cup only consists of top-tier division clubs.
3 Hong Kong League Cup was not held in the 2009–10 and 2012–13 seasons.

References

External links

1982 births
Living people
Hong Kong footballers
Association football defenders
Hong Kong First Division League players
South China AA players
Happy Valley AA players
Southern District FC players